It's All Happening may refer to:

 It's All Happening (film), a 1963 British musical film
 It's All Happening (album), by Iwrestledabearonce (2009)